The 1999–2000 season was the 103rd season of competitive football in Scotland.

League Competitions

Scottish Premier League

Scottish First Division

Scottish Second Division

Scottish Third Division

In the 1999–2000 Scottish Third Division, Queen's Park pipped Berwick Rangers to the title on the final day of the season with a 3–2 victory at Cowdenbeath, Berwick finished second and due to league reconstruction Forfar Athletic were also promoted in third place.

Other honours

Cup honours

Individual honours

SPFA awards

SFWA awards

Scottish clubs in Europe

Average coefficient – 5.125

Scotland national team

Key:
(A) = Away match
(H) = Home match
ECQG6 = European Championship Qualifying – Group 6
ECQPO = European Championship Qualifying – Playoff

Notes and references

External links
Scottish Premier League official website
Scottish Football League official website
BBC Scottish Premier League portal 
BBC Scottish Football League portal 

 
Seasons in Scottish football